Jan Grabowski (born 1962) is a Polish-Canadian professor of history at the University of Ottawa, specializing in Jewish–Polish relations in German-occupied Poland during World War II and the Holocaust in Poland.

Co-founder in 2003 of the Polish Center for Holocaust Research, in Warsaw, Poland, Grabowski is best known for his book Hunt for the Jews: Betrayal and Murder in German-Occupied Poland (2013), which won the Yad Vashem International Book Prize.

Early life and education 
Grabowski was born in Warsaw to a Roman Catholic mother and Jewish father. His father, a Holocaust survivor and chemistry professor from Kraków, fought in the 1944 Warsaw Uprising.

While at the University of Warsaw, Grabowski was active in the Independent Students' Union between 1981 and 1985, where he helped to run an underground printing press for the Solidarity movement. He received his M.A. in 1986, and in 1988 he emigrated to Canada. Travel restrictions had been eased by Poland's communist government. If he had known the regime would fall a year later, he would have stayed, he told an interviewer: "When I left in 1988 I thought there was no future for any young person in Poland. It felt like you were looking at the world through a thick wall of glass. It was sort of an un-reality ... the rules were oblique, strange, inhuman even. Then after one year the system seemed to collapse like a house of cards." He received his Ph.D. from the Université de Montréal in 1994 for a thesis entitled The Common Ground. Settled Natives and French in Montréal 1667–1760.

Academic appointments
Grabowski became a faculty member at the University of Ottawa in 1993. In 2016–17 he was an Ina Levine Invitational Scholar at the United States Holocaust Memorial Museum, where he conducted research into the Polish Blue Police for a project entitled "Polish 'Blue' Police, Bystanders, and the Holocaust in Occupied Poland, 1939–1945". He received a grant for the project (2016–2020) from the Canadian Social Sciences and Humanities Research Council.

Research

Hunt for the Jews

Grabowski is best known for his book Hunt for the Jews, first published in Poland in 2011 as Judenjagd: Polowanie na Żydów 1942–1945. In 2013 a revised and updated edition was published by Indiana University Press as Hunt for the Jews: Betrayal and Murder in German-Occupied Poland, and in 2016 a revised and expanded edition was published in Hebrew by Yad Vashem.

Awarded the Yad Vashem International Book Prize in 2014, the book describes the Judenjagd (German: "Jew hunt") from 1942 onwards, focusing on Dąbrowa Tarnowska County, a rural area in southeastern Poland. The Judenjagd was the German search for Jews who had escaped from the liquidated ghettos in Poland and were trying to hide among the non-Jewish population. Grabowski relied on Polish court records from the 1940s, post-war testimony collected by the Central Committee of Polish Jews, and records gathered in Germany during investigations in the 1960s. In a 2015 interview, he described the mechanics of the "hunt": 

According to Grabowski, most Jews in hiding were given up by local people to the Polish Blue Police or directly to the Germans. He said that Poles were "directly or indirectly" responsible for most of the deaths of over 200,000 Jews, not counting victims of the police; he explained that by "most", it could be 60 percent or as high as 90 percent.

The book sparked a heated public debate in Poland.

The Polish Police
Grabowski's book The Polish Police: Collaboration in the Holocaust (2017), published by the United States Holocaust Memorial Museum, is based on his 2016 Ina Levine Annual Lecture on the Blue Police.

Dalej jest noc
In 2018 Grabowski and Barbara Engelking co-edited a two-volume study, Dalej jest noc: losy Żydów w wybranych powiatach okupowanej Polski (Night without End: The Fates of Jews in Selected Counties of Occupied Poland). Published by the Polish Center for Holocaust Research, the study focused on nine counties in German-occupied Poland during the Holocaust, giving a detailed account of the fate of the area's Jews and of the question of Polish collaboration with the German occupiers. Grabowski contributed a chapter on Węgrów County. He told a newspaper that the work "talks about Polish virtue just as much. It paints a truthful picture."

Mark Weitzman, director of government affairs for the Simon Wiesenthal Center, said it was "meticulously researched and sourced". Polish historian Jacek Chrobaczyński commended its authors for deconstructing political myths that persist in Polish history, journalism, church, and politics. However, scholars associated with Poland's Institute of National Remembrance alleged that the study used unreliable sources, selectively treated witness statements, presented rumor as fact, and underestimated the draconian nature of the German occupation.

Litigation 
The Polish League Against Defamation, a group whose stated aim is to protect "Poland's good name", funded a civil case against Grabowski and Engelking in Poland, brought by the 81-year-old niece of a Polish villager who was accused in the book by witness testimony of having betrayed Jews to the Germans. In February 2021, a Warsaw court ruled that Grabowski and Engelking must apologize for their claims about the villager, but it did not order them to pay compensation. 

In response to the court ruling, the POLIN Museum of the History of Polish Jews, Yad Vashem, and the Simon Wiesenthal Center released statements expressing their concerns about the ruling's effects on academic freedom and freedom of speech. The POLIN Museum stated that the suit had been "an attempt to frighten scholars away from publishing the results of their research out of fear of a lawsuit and the ensuing costly litigation." 

In August 2021, an appeals court overturned the ruling against Grabowski and Engelking, arguing in favour of academic freedom.

Views

Summary
In 2016, Grabowski published a paper criticizing what he called "the history policy of the Polish state", and arguing that "the state-sponsored version of history seeks to undo the findings of the last few decades and to forcibly introduce a sanitized, feel-good narrative". He has deplored plans for a monument to rescuers of Jews, to be located at Grzybowski Square, which was part of the wartime Warsaw Ghetto; he sees it as an attempt to inflate the role of the rescuers, whom he describes as a "desperate, hunted, tiny minority", the exception to the rule. The ghetto site should be dedicated, he argues, to Jewish suffering, not to Polish courage.

Poland's embassy in Ottawa criticized Grabowski in 2016 for "groundless opinions and accusations" after he wrote an article for Maclean's about Poland's controversial amendment to its Act on the Institute of National Remembrance. The amendment would have penalized, with imprisonment for up to three years, anyone defaming Poland by accusing it of complicity in the Holocaust, with exceptions for "freedom of research, discussion of history, and artistic activity".

In July 2017, Grabowski criticized the Ulma-Family Museum of Poles Who Saved Jews in World War II, which opened in Markowa in 2016. The garden will have plaques identifying the 1,500 towns in which the nearly 6,700 Poles lived who helped Jews and were recognized by Yad Vashem as Righteous Among the Nations. In Grabowski's view, the museum should provide more information about the Polish neighbours of the Ulma family and others who aided Jews.

Grabowski co-wrote a Haaretz opinion piece in December 2018 criticizing Israeli historian Daniel Blatman, professor of modern Jewish history and Holocaust studies at the Hebrew University of Jerusalem, for accepting the post of chief historian at the newly formed Warsaw Ghetto Museum in Warsaw, Poland, and thus agreeing to be "the poster boy of [Polish] state authorities bent on turning back the clock and distorting the history of the Holocaust". In January 2019 Blatman responded in Haaretz that, while scholars at the Center for Holocaust Research had provided valuable insights into involvement in the Holocaust by parts of the Polish population, they did not give due weight to the terror and violence perpetrated by the Germans against Poles under German occupation.

Responses
Since publication of Hunt for the Jews, Grabowski has become subject to significant criticism in Poland, particularly from groups associated with Polish right-wing spectrum. Some of them attempted to have him fired from his academic position, and he has faced harassment and death threats, leading to increased security patrols in his department at the University of Ottawa.

On 7 June 2017 the Polish League Against Defamation (PLPZ) published a statement signed by about 130 Polish scholars — none of them, historians of the Holocaust — protesting against Grabowski's research, which allegedly portrayed a "false and wrongful image of Poland and Polish people". In response, the Polish Center for Holocaust Research issued a statement of its own, entitled "In defence of Jan Grabowski's good name" — signed by seven of its members, including Barbara Engelking, Jacek Leociak and Dariusz Libionka, it called the criticism "as brutal as it is absurd". On 19 June 2017, about 180 historians of Holocaust and modern European history, including Christopher Browning, Mary Fulbrook, Deborah Lipstadt, Antony Polonsky, Dina Porat, Yitzhak Arad, and Robert Jan van Pelt, signed an open letter in Grabowski's defence; describing the campaign against Grabowski as "an attack on academic freedom and integrity", the letter emphasized that "[h]is scholarship [held] to the highest standards of academic research and publication", and that the PLPZ attempted to put forth a "distorted and whitewashed version of the history of Poland during the Holocaust era". In November 2018, Grabowski filed a defemation lawsuit in Warsaw against the PLPZ; he asked that each of their signatories buy a copy of Dalej jest noc and donate it to a Polish high school.

Selected works

(2001). Historia Kanady. Warsaw: Prószyński i S-ka.  
(2004). "Ja tego Żyda znam!": Szantażowanie Żydów w Warszawie 1939–1943. Warsaw: Wydaw.  
(2008). Rescue for Money: Paid Helpers in Poland, 1939-1945. Jerusalem: Yad Vashem.  
(2010, with Barbara Engelking). Żydów łamiących prawo należy karać śmiercią! "Przestępczość" Żydów w Warszawie, 1939-1942. Warsaw: Stowarzyszenie Centrum Badań nad Zagładą Żydów.  
(2011, with Barbara Engelking). Zarys krajobrazu: wieś polska wobec zagłady Żydów 1942–1945. Warsaw: Stowarzyszenie Centrum Badań nad Zagładą Żydów.  
(2011). Judenjagd: Polowanie na Zydow 1942–1945. Warsaw: Stowarzyszenie Centrum Badań nad Zagładą Żydów.  
(2013). Hunt for the Jews: Betrayal and Murder in German-Occupied Poland. Bloomington: Indiana University Press.  
(2016).  ציד היהודים; בגידה ורצח בפולין בימי הכיבוש הגרמני. Jerusalem: Yad Vashem.  
(2014, with Dariusz Libionka, eds.). Klucze i kasa: o mieniu żydowskim w Polsce pod okupacją niemiecką i we wczesnych latach powojennych, 1939–1950. Warsaw: Stowarzyszenie Centrum Badań nad Zagładą Żydów.  
 (2017). "The Polish police: Collaboration in the Holocaust". Washington, DC: United States Holocaust Memorial Museum (Ina Levine annual lecture, 17 November 2016).
 (2018, co-edited with Barbara Engelking),\. Dalej jest noc: losy Żydów w wybranych powiatach okupowanej Polski (Night without End: The Fates of Jews in Selected Counties of Occupied Poland). Warsaw: Stowarzyszenie Centrum Badań nad Zagładą Żydów (Polish Center for Holocaust Research), 2 volumes (1,640 pp.).  
 (2020). Na posterunku. Udział polskiej policji granatowej i kryminalnej w zagładzie Żydów (On Duty: Participation of Blue and Criminal Police in the Destruction of the Jews). Wydawnictwo Czarne, Wołowiec. 
(2021). Polacy, nic się nie stało! Polemiki z Zagładą w tle (Poles, Nothing Happened! Polemics with the Holocaust in the Background), Wydawnictwa Austeria.

See also

Anti-Jewish violence in Poland, 1944–1946
Collaboration in German-occupied Poland
Fear: Anti-Semitism in Poland after Auschwitz (2006)
History of the Jews in Poland
Polish Righteous among the Nations
Rescue of Jews by Poles during the Holocaust
Szczuczyn pogrom (June 1941)
Kielce pogrom (4 July 1946)
Wąsosz pogrom (5 July 1941)
Jedwabne pogrom (10 July 1941)
Żegota

Notes

References

Further reading
 Homepage, University of Ottawa.
 Jan Grabowski, Polish Center for Holocaust Research.
 Grabowski, Jan (29 and 30 January 2018). Bogdanow Lectures in Holocaust Studies '18, University of Manchester.
 Lecture 1: "Bystanders and the Holocaust in Poland".
 Lecture 2: "The Polish 'Blue' Police and its Role in the Implementation of the 'Final Solution'".
 

1962 births
20th-century Canadian historians
Living people
Historians of the Holocaust in Poland
Polish emigrants to Canada
21st-century Polish historians
Polish male non-fiction writers
Université de Montréal alumni
Academic staff of the University of Ottawa
University of Warsaw alumni
Polish people of Jewish descent
Fellows of the Royal Society of Canada
20th-century Polish historians
21st-century Canadian historians